Amneal Pharmaceuticals, Inc. is an American publicly traded generics and specialty pharmaceutical company. The company is headquartered in Bridgewater, New Jersey.

History
Amneal Pharmaceuticals was founded in 2002 by brothers Chirag and Chintu Patel. The company manufactured its first prescription product in 2005 and received its first  in 2006.

In 2007, the company acquired five divested drugs from Mylan which Mylan was forced to sell as part of their acquisition of the generics unit of Merck KGaA.  At this time, the company was noted as being a private company based in Paterson, New Jersey.

After the 2007 acquisition of Akyma Pharmaceuticals, a Glasgow, Kentucky-based regional distributor, Amneal launched its own product label. 
 
In 2008, the company expanded into India with the development of an R&D Centre in Gujarat. Continued expansion in the United States occurred between 2010 and 2016 in New Jersey, New York and Kentucky. As of 2017, the company had grown much of its physical footprint and product base through a series of acquisitions, including the acquisition of assets from Pfizer, Actavis and Warner Chilcott.

In 2018, Amneal Pharmaceuticals LLC merged with Impax Laboratories, Inc. to form Amneal Pharmaceuticals, Inc. Shares of newly public AMRX began trading on the NYSE on May 7, 2018. Concurrent with the Impax merger, Amneal acquired Gemini Laboratories for $117 million, including Unithroid, Gemini's lead product for treating hypothyroidism.

In December 2019, Amneal announced it had entered into an agreement to acquire a majority interest in AvKARE, a private label provider of generic pharmaceuticals in the US federal agency sector. Under the agreement, AvKARE would continue to operate as an independent subsidiary of Amneal.

As of June 2020, co-founders Chirag and Chintu Patel served as co-CEOs of the company, while Paul Meister served as chairman.

In January 2021, the business announced it would acquire 98% of Kashiv BioSciences LLC and its drug delivery platforms.

In January 2022, Amneal announced it would acquire Saol Therapeutics Baclofen franchise for around $83.5 million, plus future royalties.

Formation of Amneal Pharmaceuticals Inc
In 2018, Amneal Pharmaceuticals LLC merged with Impax Laboratories, Inc. to form Amneal Pharmaceuticals, Inc. The FTC described the merger as having a value of US$1.45 billion, and required the companies to divest several marketed products and development projects as a condition of the approval. The merger was completed in May 2018, with shares of IPXL ceasing trading on NASDAQ on May 4 and shares of AMRX commencing trading on the NYSE on May 7. The company's predecessor entity, privately held Impax Pharmaceuticals, Inc., was founded in 1995. Publicly traded Global Pharmaceutical Corporation and Impax Pharmaceuticals, Inc. completed a reverse merger, forming Impax Laboratories, Inc. on December 14, 1999.

List of mergers and acquisitions 
The following is an illustration of the company's major mergers and acquisitions and historical predecessors:

Amneal Pharmaceuticals, Inc. 
 Amneal Pharmaceuticals (Merged 2018)
Amneal Pharmaceuticals LLC
Akyma Pharmaceuticals (Acq. 2007)
Impax Laboratories, Inc.
Gemini Laboratories (Acq. 2018)
AvKARE (Acq. 2019)
Kashiv BioSciences LLC (Acq. 2021)

Operations

Research and development
As of July 2019, Amneal operated seven Research and Development (R&D) centers in the United States, India and Ireland. According to the company, 10% of net revenue is invested in R&D.

After the Impax merger, Amneal was reportedly the fifth largest U.S. generic drug maker in the United States with a generics portfolio inclusive of more than 200 product families, approximately 149 ANDAs filed with the FDA, and 135 projects in development at that time.

The company's research and development activity in the biosimilar space has included a 2017 partnership with Adello Biologics (for the collaborative development of Neupogen and Neuasta biosimilars) and a 2018 partnership with mAbxience (for the development of Avastin biosimilars).

Pharmaceutical products
Amneal's Generics Division focuses on a broad range of therapeutic areas, including solid oral dosage products and alternative dosage form products.

The company's Specialty Pharma Division is focused on the development of proprietary branded pharmaceutical products for the treatment of Central Nervous System disorders, Endocrine disorders and other select specialty segments.

This division commercializes several branded pharmaceutical products, including Rytary, an extended release oral capsule formulation for the treatment of Parkinson's disease, Unithroid, for treatment of hypothyroidism, Emverm, for treatment of certain gastrointestinal infections, and Zomig Nasal Spray, for the acute treatment of migraines.

As of July 2019, the company owned ten manufacturing sites and seven R&D sites in the United States, Ireland and India.

In 2020, in response to the interest in chloroquine and hydroxychloroquine during the COVID-19 pandemic, and before the United States Food and Drug Administration's emergency use authorization was withdrawn, Amneal ramped up production.

References

External links

Pharmaceutical companies established in 1995
Pharmaceutical companies of the United States
Bridgewater Township, New Jersey
Companies based in Somerset County, New Jersey
Generic drug manufacturers
Pharmaceutical companies based in New Jersey